Ceratophora tennentii, commonly known as the rhinoceros agama, horn-nosed lizard, and Tennent's leaf-nosed lizard,  is a species of lizard in the family Agamidae. The species is endemic to Sri Lanka.

Etymology
The generic name, Ceratophora, means horn bearer.

The specific name, tennentii, is in honour of Irish politician James Emerson Tennent, who was Colonial Secretary of Ceylon (1845–1850).

Description
C. tennentii has a leaf-like appendage on the end of its nose. The species can reach lengths of over  including the tail. Males usually have more green in their coloration than females have, although they can change color to a reddish brown. Females usually have a shorter appendage on the nose. C. tennentii is not very agile and relies more on coloration than speed to avoid predators.

The head is oval, and longer than wide. The rostral appendage is fleshy, laterally compressed, leaf-like with a bluntly conical scale at the tip. The lamellae under fourth toe number 23-30.

The dorsum is reddish brown to olive green. The larger flank scales are more green. The gular region and sides of the neck have dark markings. The tail has 20 dark brown cross-bands. The venter is cream-coloured.

Behaviour
C. tennentii is diurnal, and therefore is usually only active in the day. Very little is actually known about the behaviour of this unusual lizard.

Habitat
It has also been recorded in several other forest habitats.

Diet
C. tennentii is reported to feed on insects and other small arthropods.

Reproduction
C. tennentii lays eggs and is a sexually reproducing animal.

Threats
Threats to C. tennentii include deforestation, pesticides, climate change, forest fires, and bioaccumulation. Much of its habitat has been cleared for illegal logging and the cardamom, coffee, tea, and rubber plantations over the past two centuries.

Captivity
As of 2006, the leaf-nosed lizard is protected because of its endangered status, making its trade illegal.

Conservation efforts
Cardamom cultivation had to be abandoned in this area. However, rather than natural regeneration, the cardamom range was taken over by invasive weeds such as mistflower (Eupatorium riparium) and lantana (Lantana camara). C. tennentii was placed on the endangered list by the IUCN in 2006.

References

External links
Reptiles Magazine,  
Discovery Communications, LLC.  Downloaded on 9 October 2012.

Further reading
Boulenger GA (1887). Catalogue of the Lizards in the British Museum (Natural History). Second Edition. Volume I. ... Agamidæ. London: Trustees of the British Museum (Natural History). (Taylor and Francis, Printers). xii + 436 pp. + Plates I-XXXII. (Ceratophora tennentii, p. 278).
Boulenger GA (1890). The Fauna of British India, Including Ceylon and Burma. Reptilia and Batrachia. London: Secretary of State for India in Council. (Taylor and Francis, printers). xviii + 541 pp. (Ceratophora tennentii, p. 120).
Günther A (1861). "Ceratophora Tennentii, new species". p. 281 + unnumbered plate. In: Tennent JE (1861). Sketches of the Natural History of Ceylon with Narratives and Anecdotes Illustrative of the Habits and Instincts of the Mammalia, Birds, Reptiles, Fishes, Insects, &c. Including a Monograph of the Elephant and a Description of the Modes of Capturing and Training It. London: Longman, Green, Longman & Roberts. xxiii + 500 pp.
Günther ACLG (1864). The Reptiles of British India. London: The Ray Society. (Taylor and Francis, printers). xxvii + 452 pp. + Plates I-XXVI. (Ceratophora tennentii, pp. 130-131).
Smith MA (1935). The Fauna of British India, Including Ceylon and Burma. Reptilia and Amphibia. Vol. II.—Sauria. London: Secretary of State for India in Council. (Taylor and Francis, printers). xiii + 440 pp. + Plate I + 2 maps. ("Ceratophora tennenti [sic]", pp. 153–154).

Reptiles of Sri Lanka
Ceratophora
Lizards of Asia
Endemic fauna of Sri Lanka
Reptiles described in 1861
Taxa named by Albert Günther
Taxonomy articles created by Polbot